St Saviour's Church is a church in Kërçishti i Epërm, Dibër County, Albania. It was designated a Cultural Monument of Albania in 1970.

The annual holiday Spasovden is celebrated at the church by the Macedonian Orthodox population.

References

Cultural Monuments of Albania
Buildings and structures in Dibër (municipality)